is the 25th single by Japanese entertainer Akina Nakamori. Written by Natsumi Tadano and Junko Hirotani, the single was released on November 6, 1990, by Warner Pioneer through the Reprise label. It was also the second single from her fifth compilation album Best III.

Background 
"Mizu ni Sashita Hana" was used as the theme song of the NTV drama series . Nakamori has re-recorded the song for the 1995 compilation True Album Akina 95 Best and the 2002 self-cover compilation Utahime Double Decade.

Chart performance 
"Mizu ni Sashita Hana" became Nakamori's 22nd and final No. 1 on Oricon's weekly singles chart and sold over 339,800 copies. It was also certified Gold by the RIAJ.

Track listing

Charts

Certification

References

External links 
 
 
 

1990 singles
1990 songs
Akina Nakamori songs
Japanese-language songs
Japanese television drama theme songs
Warner Music Japan singles
Reprise Records singles
Oricon Weekly number-one singles